Serious Sam is a video game series created and primarily developed by Croteam. It consists predominantly of first-person shooters. The series follows the advances of mercenary Sam "Serious" Stone against Mental, an extraterrestrial overlord who attempts to destroy humanity at various points in time. The first game, Serious Sam: The First Encounter, was released for Microsoft Windows in March 2001. Several spin-offs were developed by other developers, such as a Palm OS conversion of The First Encounter by InterActive Vision, Serious Sam: Next Encounter (on GameCube and PlayStation 2) by Climax Solent, and Serious Sam Advance (on Game Boy Advance) by Climax London. All three were published by Global Star Software.

Development 

Croteam created a proprietary engine for use in both Serious Sam: The First Encounter and Serious Sam: The Second Encounter. At the time Croteam was making Serious Sam, licensing other engines was costly (upwards of ), so they made their own from scratch, following the feature set of the first Doom engine, which simulated 3D spaces in 2D, and did not include up or down targeting. As they were creating their own, both Duke Nukem 3D (which added up-and-down freelook) and Quake (a fully 3D rendered environment) were released, requiring Croteam to incorporate these features into their engine for their game to be competitive. Development was further complicated when the first 3D accelerators were released, forcing Croteam to develop for hardware rendering over software. Recognizing they needed to bring something new to what other games were pushing at that time, Croteam decided that they would make their Serious Engine support extremely large environments, with virtual view distances of over a kilometre, physics support, and capable of rendering up to a hundred enemies on screen at a time, and do this on the processing power of what current low-end computers using the original Pentium CPUs could handle. The team devised ways of doing object path caching so that they only had to perform collision detection with environmental features every few seconds rather than every cycle. Collision detection was also sped up by approximating the environment with spheres rather than boxes. This also enabled them to have multidirection gravity which was used for some of the game's secret areas.

Serious Engine 1 is available as open-source software. A more powerful iteration of the Serious Engine was developed for use in Serious Sam 2 and is known as Serious Engine 2. It supports many features of modern GPUs such as pixel and vertex shaders, HDR, bloom and parallax mapping. Serious Engine 3 was used in Serious Sam HD: The First Encounter and Serious Sam HD: The Second Encounter. It includes detailed shading, and enemies are re-modelled to look more realistic. This engine is also being developed to harness the full capacity of HDR and high definition mapping. An updated version, Serious Engine 3.5, is used in Serious Sam 3.

Serious Sam is voiced by John J. Dick.

After the release of both HD remakes of the original Serious Sam episodes, Devolver Digital re-released both classic encounters in 2010 and Serious Sam 2 in 2011.

Games

Main series

Spin-offs

Notes

References

External links 
 

 
Video game franchises introduced in 2001
Indie video games